Walkermine (earlier, International) is a former settlement in Plumas County, California. It lay at an elevation of 6076 feet (1852 m).

The International post office operated from 1918 to 1923. The Walkermine post office operated from 1930 to 1941. Both names came from nearby mines.

References

Former populated places in California
Former settlements in Plumas County, California